The Department of Immigration and Ethnic Affairs was an Australian government department that existed between March 1993 and March 1996.

Scope
Information about the department's functions and/or government funding allocation could be found in the Administrative Arrangements Orders, the annual Portfolio Budget Statements and in the Department's annual reports.

According to the Administrative Arrangements Order (AAO) made on 24 March 1993, the Department dealt with:

 Migration, including refugees
 Citizenship
 Ethnic affairs
 Post-arrival arrangements for migrants, other than migrant child education

Structure
The Department was an Australian Public Service department, staffed by officials who were responsible to the Minister for Immigration and Ethnic Affairs. The Minister was Nick Bolkus.

The Secretary of the Department was C. Conybeare.

References

1993 establishments in Australia
1996 disestablishments in Australia
Immigration and Ethnic Affairs
Ministries established in 1993
Government agencies disestablished in 1996